Salvatore Cascino (21 August 1917 – 21 April 1990) was an Italian racewalker who competed at the 1948 Summer Olympics.

References

External links
 

1917 births
1990 deaths
Athletes (track and field) at the 1948 Summer Olympics
Athletes (track and field) at the 1952 Summer Olympics
Italian male racewalkers
Olympic athletes of Italy
20th-century Italian people